This article contains information about the literary events and publications of 1674.

Events
March 26 – The new Theatre Royal, Drury Lane opens in March. Designed by Christopher Wren, it replaces the original theatre that burned down in 1672.
unknown dates
The poet Isaac de Benserade is elected to the French Academy, along with the churchman and scholar Pierre Daniel Huet.
Schlosstheater Celle is founded. By the 21st century it will be the oldest surviving theatre in Germany.
The derivative nature of Restoration drama is displayed when the Duke's Company produces Thomas Shadwell's "operatic" re-adaptation of Dryden and Davenant's 1667 adaptation of The Tempest. In response, their rivals at the King's Company stage The Mock Tempest, or the Enchanted Castle by Thomas Duffet.

New books

Prose
Samuel Chappuzeau – Le Théâtre François
Charles Cotton – The Compleat Gamester
John Evelyn – Navigation and Commerce
John Josselyn – An Account of the Voyages to New England, London: Printed for Giles Widdows
Thomas Ken – Manual of Prayers for the use of the Scholars of Winchester College
Anthony Wood – Historia et antiquitates Universitatis Oxoniensis

Drama
Anonymous (and John Dryden?) – The Mistaken Husband
Juan Bautista Diamante – Parte II de comedias
William Cavendish, Duke of Newcastle – The Triumphant Widow
Pierre Corneille – Suréna
John Crowne – Andromache
Sir William Davenant – Macbeth, a "dramatic opera" adapted from Shakespeare's play, is published
Thomas Duffet (attributed to) – The Amorous Old Woman
The Empress of Morocco: a Farce
The Mock Tempest
Nathaniel Lee – The Tragedy of Nero, Emperour of Rome
Jean Racine – Iphigénie
  Elkanah Settle – Love and Revenge

Poetry
Thomas Flatman – Poems and Songs
John Milton – Paradise Lost, second edition

Births
January 15 – Prosper Jolyot de Crébillon, French poet and dramatist (died 1762)
June 20 – Nicholas Rowe (dramatist) English dramatist and Poet Laureate (died 1718)
October – Thomas Ruddiman, Scottish classicist (died 1757)
October 6 – Nicolas-Hubert de Mongault, French writer and cleric (died 1746) 
December – Christmas Samuel, Welsh writer and minister (died 1764)

Deaths
March 7 – Charles Sorel, sieur de Souvigny, French novelist (born 1602)
June 14 – Marin le Roy de Gomberville, French poet and novelist (born 1600)
August 13 – Lucidor (Lars Johansson), Swedish burlesque poet (born 1638; killed in duel)
September 27 
Robert Arnauld d'Andilly, French poet and translator (born 1589)
Thomas Traherne, English poet and religious writer (born c. 1636)
October – Robert Herrick, English poet (born 1591)
November 8 – John Milton, English poet and polemicist (born 1608)
December 9 – Edward Hyde, 1st Earl of Clarendon English historian and statesman (born 1609)
Unknown dates
Hu Zhengyan, Chinese artist, printmaker, calligrapher and publisher (born c. 1584)
James Janeway, English children's writer and Puritan minister (born 1636)
Miguel Sánchez, Mexican priest, writer and theologian (born 1594)

References

 
Years of the 17th century in literature